Michael Moss is an American journalist and author.  He was awarded the Pulitzer Prize for Explanatory Reporting in 2010, and was a finalist for the prize in 2006 and 1999. He is also the recipient of the Gerald Loeb Award for Large Newspapers and an Overseas Press Club citation. Before joining The New York Times, he was a reporter for The Wall Street Journal, New York Newsday, The Atlanta Journal-Constitution, The Grand Junction Daily Sentinel and The High Country News. He has been an adjunct professor at the Columbia School of Journalism and currently lives in Brooklyn with his wife and two sons.

Bibliography
 Salt Sugar Fat: How the Food Giants Hooked Us (2013) 
Hooked: Food, Free Will, and How the Food Giants Exploit Our Addictions (2021)

References

Pulitzer Prize for Explanatory Journalism winners
Living people
American food writers
James Beard Foundation Award winners
San Francisco State University alumni
Columbia University Graduate School of Journalism faculty
Gerald Loeb Award winners for Large Newspapers
Year of birth missing (living people)